The Chronicle of Anna Magdalena Bach is a 1968 film by the French filmmaking duo of Jean-Marie Straub and Danièle Huillet. It was their first full-length feature film, and reportedly took a decade to finance. The film stars renowned harpsichordist Gustav Leonhardt as Johann Sebastian Bach and Christiane Lang as Anna Magdalena Bach. The orchestral music was performed by Concentus Musicus and conducted by Nikolaus Harnoncourt. It is the first of several Straub-Huillet films to be based on works of classical music. The film was entered into the 18th Berlin International Film Festival.

Though, as on all of their films, Straub and Huillet contributed to the film equally, Straub is the officially credited director.

Cast
 Gustav Leonhardt – Johann Sebastian Bach
 Christiane Lang – Anna Magdalena Bach
 Paolo Carlini – Hölzel
 Ernst Castelli – Steger
 Hans-Peter Boye – Born
 Joachim Wolff – Rector
 Rainer Kirchner – Superintendent
 Eckart Bruntjen – Prefect Kittler
 Walter Peters – Prefect Krause
 Kathrien Leonhard – Catherina Dorothea Bach
 Anja Fahrmann – Regine Susanna Bach
 Katja Drewanz – Christine Sophie Henrietta Bach
 Bob van Asperen – Johann Elias Bach
 Andreas Pangritz – Wilhelm Friedemann Bach
 Bernd Weikl – Singer in Cantata No. 205
 Nikolaus Harnoncourt – Prince of Anhalt-Köthen

Style and content
The Chronicle of Anna Magdalena Bach consists of excerpts from Johann Sebastian Bach's works, presented in chronological order and linked by a fictional journal written by his second wife, Anna Magdalena Bach. Each work is typically presented in a single, often immobile take, with the musicians performing in the locations where many of the works were premiered, dressed in period costumes.

Works featured
Works excerpted in the film, in order of appearance, are:

Brandenburg Concerto No. 5, BWV 1050: Allegro 1 (First Movement), bars 147–227
Prelude 6 in E major from the Klavierbüchlein für Wilhelm Friedemann Bach, BWV 854
(French) Suite #1 in D Minor from the Notebook for Anna Magdalena Bach, BWV 812: Minuet 2
Sonata No. 2 in D major for viola da gamba and obbligato harpsichord, BWV 1028: Adagio
Trio-sonata No. 2 in C Minor for Organ, BWV 526: Largo
Magnificat in D major, BWV 243: Sicut locutus est; Gloria (first part)
Partita #6 in E minor from the Notebook for Anna Magdalena Bach, BWV 830: Gavotte
Cantata BWV 205 ("Aeolus placated"): Bass recitative ("Ja! Ja! Die Stunden sind nunmehro nah") and Aria ("Wie will ich lustig lachen")
Cantata BWV 198 (Funeral Ode for Queen Christiane Eberhardine): Final chorus ("Doch, Königin! du stirbest nicht")
Cantata BWV 244a (Funeral music for Leopold, Prince of Anhalt-Köthen): Aria, "Mit Freuden sei die Welt verlassen" (music lost, reconstructed from St Matthew Passion, BWV 244, "Aus Liebe will mein Heiland sterben")
St Matthew Passion, BWV 244: Opening chorus ("Kommt, ihr Töchter, helft mir klagen")
Cantata BWV 42: Sinfonia (Da capo: bars 1–53) and tenor recitative ("Am Abend aber desselbigen Sabbats")
Prelude in B Minor for Organ, BWV 544, bars 1–17
Mass in B Minor, BWV 232: Opening (start of the first Kyrie, bars 1–29)
Cantata BWV 215 (for the coronation of August III): Opening chorus ("Preise dein Glücke, gesegnetes Sachsen"), bars 1–181
Ascension Oratorio, BWV 11: final chorale, 2nd part
Conventional Sunday motet (11th after Trinity) by Leo Leonius from the Florilegium Portense
Clavier-Uebung, BWV 671: Organ-chorale from the 3rd part ("Kyrie, God Holy Spirit")
Italian Concerto, BWV 971: Andante
Cantata Wachet auf, ruft uns die Stimme, BWV 140 ("Awake, the voice calls to us"): 1st duet, bars 1–36
Goldberg Variations, BWV 988: Variation 25
Cantata BWV 82 ("I am content"), last recitative
Musical Offering, BWV 1079: Ricercar a 6, harpsichord, bars 1–139
The Art of Fugue, BWV 1080: Contrapunctus XIV, bars 193–239 (harpsichord), last part
Chorale for Organ, BWV 668 ("Before thy throne, I tread"), bars 1–11

References

External links

1968 films
1960s avant-garde and experimental films
1960s biographical films
1968 musical films
German avant-garde and experimental films
German biographical films
German musical films
West German films
1960s German-language films
Films set in the 18th century
Films directed by Jean-Marie Straub and Danièle Huillet
German black-and-white films
Films set in Germany
Films about classical music and musicians
Films about composers
Cultural depictions of Johann Sebastian Bach
1960s German films